The Toy Industry Hall of Fame recognizes the contributions of toy-makers around the world.  It is maintained by the Toy Industry Foundation, an arm of the US  Toy Industry Association.

See also

 National Toy Hall of Fame
 List of toys and children's media awards

References

External links
Toy Industry Hall of Fame at the Toy Industry Association. Archived from the original on April 12, 2017.

Halls of fame in New York (state)
Toy halls of fame